Michał Jasiczek (born March 13, 1994 in Lublin, Poland) is an alpine skier from Poland. He competed for Poland at the 2014 Winter Olympics in the alpine skiing events.

References

1994 births
Living people
Olympic alpine skiers of Poland
Alpine skiers at the 2014 Winter Olympics
Alpine skiers at the 2018 Winter Olympics
Alpine skiers at the 2022 Winter Olympics
Polish male alpine skiers
Sportspeople from Lublin
21st-century Polish people